Gábor Schmiedt (born 25 January 1962) is a Hungarian water polo player. He competed at the 1988 Summer Olympics and the 1992 Summer Olympics.

See also
 List of World Aquatics Championships medalists in water polo

References

External links
 

1962 births
Living people
Hungarian male water polo players
Olympic water polo players of Hungary
Water polo players at the 1988 Summer Olympics
Water polo players at the 1992 Summer Olympics
Water polo players from Budapest